Celldweller is the self-titled debut extended play (EP) by the electronic rock project Celldweller. Only 250 copies were made and sold out quickly. The first three tracks are credited to Celldweller and were re-recorded for the debut full-length album that was released four years later; the fourth and fifth tracks were credited simply to Klayton and later appeared on The Beta Cessions Vol. 1.

Track listing

Additional personnel 
 Ben Grosse – Mixing
 Richard Hunt – Editing
 Kennedy James – Drums
 Grant Mohrman – Acoustic guitar, producer, engineer, mixing
 Jarrod Montague – Drums
 Erik Wolf – Mastering

References

Celldweller albums
2000 EPs